Adobe Player may refer to:

Adobe Systems products 
 Adobe Flash Player
 Adobe Media Player

See also 
 Adobe Systems
 List of Adobe software